The Ministry of Marine Resources is a ministry responsible for monitoring marine resources in Somalia. The last such minister was Abdirahman Hashi.

See also
 Agriculture in Somalia

References

Government ministries of Somalia